Wilburn is an unincorporated community in Cullman County, Alabama, United States, located just outside Bug Tussle.

References

Unincorporated communities in Cullman County, Alabama
Unincorporated communities in Alabama